Ian Wingrove is an English-American special and visual effects artist. He was nominated for an Academy Award in the category Best Visual Effects for the film Return to Oz.

Selected filmography 
 Return to Oz (1985; co-nominated with Will Vinton, Zoran Perisic and Michael Lloyd)

References

External links 

Living people
Place of birth missing (living people)
Year of birth missing (living people)
Special effects people
Visual effects artists
Visual effects supervisors
English emigrants to the United States